Gruber's Journey or Călătoria lui Gruber is a 2008 Romanian drama film directed by Radu Gabrea. It is set in World War II during the Holocaust in Iași (Iași pogrom) and was shot on location in Bucharest. The film screened at the Third Annual Romanian Film Festival.

Plot
The film centers on an Italian writer named Curzio Malaparte, who was a member of the Italian Fascist Party.

Malaparte is assigned to cover the Russian front for the Italian news service, and travels with Colonel Freitag of the Wehrmacht and the deputy commander of the local Romanian garrison to Romania. He suffers from a serious allergy and is sent to consult world-class allergist, Dr. Josef Gruber in Iași, but Gruber is missing.

Suffering terribly from his allergy, Malaparte desperately seeks to find the doctor who has been captured. During his search for the doctor he encounters shocking situations in the Holocaust against the Jews in the city. He later writes a very critical account of the incident in his novel Kaputt.

Cast
Florin Piersic Jr. as Curzio Malaparte
Marcel Iureș as Doctor Gruber
Udo Schenk as Col. Freitag
Claudiu Bleonț as Col. Niculescu-Coca
Alexandru Bindea as Guido Sartori
Răzvan Vasilescu as Stavarache
Andi Vasluianu as Mircea
Ionuț Grama as Consulate Driver
Mihai Gruia Sandu  as Dr. Anghel
Dumitru-Paul Fălticeanu as Soldier
Cristina Bodnărescu as Wome
Trefi Alexandru as Soldier

Production
In September 2007, scenes were shot at the North railway station in Suceava. The railway station was chosen by the filmmakers to appear in the film because its architecture was reminiscent of the period of the Second World War.

References

External links
 

Jews and Judaism in Iași
2008 films
2000s historical drama films
Holocaust films
The Holocaust in Romania
Romanian World War II films
Hungarian World War II films
Romanian historical drama films
2008 drama films
Films about writers
Films set in Romania
Films shot in Bucharest
Curzio Malaparte
Romanian war drama films
Hungarian war drama films